John Beard Allen (May 18, 1845January 28, 1903) was an American lawyer and politician who served as a United States senator from Washington from 1889 to 1893. A member of the Republican Party, he previously served as the United States representative from Washington Territory's at-large congressional district in 1889.

Early life
Allen was born in Crawfordsville, Indiana on May 18, 1845.

Career
He served as a private in the Union Army with the 135th Indiana Volunteers during the American Civil War.  He earned a law degree from the University of Michigan and passed the bar in 1869.

He moved to Washington in 1870, and started a law practice in Olympia.

He served as United States attorney (1875–1885), and as reporter for the supreme court for the Territory of Washington from 1878 to 1885.

He was a Republican Delegate to the United States House of Representatives in 1889, and after Washington achieved statehood, he was elected and served in the United States Senate from 1889 to 1893. After the legislature failed to select a Senator for the following term, Allen was appointed by the Governor of Washington, but was not seated by the Senate.

Death and legacy
After leaving public office, Allen went into private law practice in Seattle, Washington, where he died of cardiovascular disease in 1903.

John B. Allen Elementary School was dedicated in 1904, part of the Seattle School District. Seattle School District architect, James Stephens, designed the two-story, wooden building, which housed 278 students at the end of its first year. In 1917, the District opened a second brick building and enrollment increased, peaking at 758 in 1933. The school closed in June 1981.

References

External links
 Retrieved on February 14, 2008
The Political Graveyard
John B. Allen School

People from Crawfordsville, Indiana
Union Army soldiers
People of Indiana in the American Civil War
Delegates to the United States House of Representatives from Washington Territory
United States Attorneys
Washington (state) lawyers
1845 births
1903 deaths
Washington (state) Republicans
Republican Party United States senators from Washington (state)
University of Michigan Law School alumni
People from Olympia, Washington
19th-century American politicians